Olajumoke Odetola  (born 16 October 1988) is a Nigerian actress and film producer. She started off her Nollywood career in the English-language cinema, before acting in several Yoruba-language films.

Early life and education 
Born on 16 October 1988 in Lagos. Olajumoke Otedola is the last born from a family of Nine. Parents and Seven Children (6 girls, 1 boy) By origin the actress is from Ijemo in Abeokuta, Ogun State .
Odetola attended ABATI Nur/Pry School in Lagos State , she then had her secondary education at Abeokuta Grammar School "ABEOKUTA Girls Grammar School, Abeokuta" . She obtained her first degree from Ajayi Crowther University, Oyo State getting a bachelor's degree in Information and Communication Technology/Computer Science, she then proceeded to Federal University of Agriculture, Abeokuta, graduating with a master's degree in Computer Science.She revealed in an interview that she graduated from the higher institution with a CGPA of 4.3. The actress had her NYSC service year at Abia State .

Career 
According to a Punch interview, Odetola disclosed that her decision to venture into acting was contrary to the wishes of her parents. But her fulfillment in the entertainment industry led them to accept her chosen career. She also described her character in Somewhere in the Dark, a film that featured Gabriel Afolayan as her most challenging film role. She cited Majid Michel  and Omotola Jalade Ekehinde as great inspirations in her budding days as an actress while Abiodun Jimoh is her main mentor in the film business.

Awards 

In 2015, she won revelation of the year category at BON Awards. Also, at the Africa Magic Viewers Choice Awards, Odetola won the award for best indigenous language film for her role in Binta Ofege and somewhere in the dark. She retained the award in the 5th edition of the ceremony through Somewhere in the Dark. She also won the best actress in a lead role (Yoruba) at 2017 Best of Nollywood Awards in Ogun State. The 2017 City People Movie Awards saw Odetola get a nomination for best supporting actress (Yoruba).

Jumoke Odetola became the Best Actress at the City People Movie Awards, 2018.

Filmography 
 Somewhere in the Dark
 Glitterati
 Binta Ofege
 Heroes and Zeros
 Lagido
 Bachelor's Eve
 Alakiti
 HigiHaga
 Tinsel
 The Return Of HigiHaga
 Family Ties
 Kanipe (2017)
 Wetin Women Want (2018)
 The Village Headmaster
 Mirror

Awards and nominations

References 

21st-century Nigerian actresses
Yoruba women filmmakers
Yoruba actresses
Living people
1980 births
Federal University of Agriculture, Abeokuta alumni
Africa Magic Viewers' Choice Awards winners
Nigerian television actresses
Ajayi Crowther University alumni
Nigerian film actresses
Actresses in Yoruba cinema
Actresses from Ogun State